Anders Örbom (May 9, 1675 – May 25, 1740) was a captain in the Swedish Army who was at the Surrender at Perevolochna and taken to Siberia as a prisoner of war for 13 years.

Biography
Örbom was born in Örebro, Sweden on May 9, 1675 to a man named Brask, who was a district court judge in Örebro. The record of his birth has not been found in Örebro, he may have been born without a family name, only a patronym, and was assigned a family name when he became a soldier.  He joined the regiment of Närke in 1691, where Örebro is located. In this regiment, Örbom was already a common soldier's name, and his predecessor on his first military position was also called Örbom.

He took part in the campaign at Humlebäck on Zealand, a Danish island where Copenhagen is located, in 1700. On July 7, 1701, he left camp and on July 9, 1701, he crossed the Düna River in Riga in Ukraine. There they conquered the Saxony troops and took about 700 prisoners. He fought in the Battle of Klissow on July 7, 1702, and the Battle of Pułtusk on April 21, 1703.  He participated in the Battle of Reusch-Lemberg in 1704, and the Battle of Fraustadt on February 3, 1706, and was promoted to lieutenant with Jämtland Ranger Regiment. He participated on July 4, 1708, in the Battle of Holowczyn. He was wounded with a bullet to the face. The bullet remained lodged in his skull the remainder of his life. He also participated in the Battle of Lakowitz.

Capture
He was captured on the Dnieper River, in Ukraine on July 1, 1709, and was taken to Siberia as a prisoner-of-war along with other officers during the Surrender at Perevolochna. All the soldiers were executed, and the officers were imprisoned in Siberia. He married Anna Elisabeth Von Rohr (1701–1744) on September 5, 1719, in Solikamsk, Siberia, Russia. Anna's father was Joakim von Rohr, Lieutenant Colonel and Commander of Dalarö fortress, the military fortress east of Stockholm, on the Baltic. Her mother was Katarina Charlotta Klingenberg. Together Anders and Elisabeth had their first child in Siberia: 
 Anders Örbom II (1720–1783), who was a captain in the Swedish Army, married Christina Ruuth (1727–1781).

Return from Siberia
Anders returned home to Sweden in 1721 or 1722 after 13 years of imprisonment. He was promoted to cavalry captain with Jämtland's cavalry company, and in 1727 became squadron chief. He lived in Brunflo and later Rödön. He had the following additional children:
 Carl Joachim Örbom (1722–1810) a captain of the Swedish Army who married Beata Dorothea von Saltza (1721–1764)
 Erik Johan Örbom (1723–1802) a major in the Jämtland Regiment who married Helena Ruuth (1729–1802). One son assumed the name Ruuth instead of Örbom and still has descendants with that name.
 Anna Catharina Örbom (1725-1784) married 1st to Nils Oldenberg, 2nd to Karl Bange, 1717-1784
 Gustaf Örbom I (1728–1730)
 Charlotta Örbom (1730-1755)
 Gustaf Örbom II (1732–1807) a captain in the Swedish Army who married Sophia Lovisa Winnberg (1744–1807)
 Christopher Örbom (1735–1828) a captain in the Swedish Army who married Eva Maria Strandqvist (1776-1863)
 Sara Elisabeth Örbom (1736-1814) married Karl Henrik Lemberg (1745-1809)
 Petrus Örbom (1738-?) a lieutenant in the Swedish Army

Death
Captain Anders Örbom died on May 25, 1740, and he was buried in Rödön, Sweden on June 5, 1740.

Timeline
 1675 Birth in Örebro, Sweden
 1691 Joins military at age 16
 1706 Promoted to lieutenant in Jämtland Ranger Regiment at age 31
 1709 Taken to Siberia as a prisoner-of-war during the Battle of Poltava at age 34
 1740 Died in Rödön

See also
 Johan Cronman

References

External links
 Anders Örbom at Findagrave

1675 births
1740 deaths
Swedish Army officers